KFC (short for Kentucky Fried Chicken) is a chain of fast-food restaurants based in Louisville, Kentucky, United States.

KFC may also refer to:

Food 
 Korean fried chicken
 Kennedy Fried Chicken

Organizations
 Kenya Film Commission
 Kenya Flower Council
 Kenya Fluorspar Company
 Kerala Financial Corporation
 Kitakyushu Film Commission, Japan

Football clubs
 Kaaseman F.C. in Ghana
 Kabinburi F.C. in Thailand
 Kalasin F.C. in Thailand
 Kanbawza F.C. in Myanmar
 Kangaroos Football Club in Australia
 Kaya F.C. in the Philippines
 Keith F.C. in Scotland
 Keshavarz F.C. in Iran
 Kilmarnock F.C. in Scotland
 Kingstonian F.C., an English non-League football team
 Kolding FC in Denmark
 Kourou FC in French Guiana
 KFC Komárno in Slovakia
 Kooger Football Club, a precursor of AZ in the Netherlands
 KFC Uerdingen 05 in Germany
in Belgium (Koninklijke, hence initial "K", means "Royal" in Flemish and Dutch)
 K.F.C. Dessel Sport
 KFC Diest
 K.F.C. Germinal Beerschot
 KFC Moerbeke
 KFC Strombeek
 K.F.C. Turnhout
 K.F.C. Vigor Wuitens Hamme
 K.F.C. Winterslag

Other uses
Key Financial Controls
Konda language (Dravidian), by ISO 639-3 code
KFC (AM), a radio station licensed to Seattle, Washington in 1921-1923

See also
 K of C